"Pretty Flamingo" is a song written by Mark Barkan, which became a hit in 1966 when Manfred Mann's recording of it was released as a single. The single reached number one in the UK Singles Chart on 5 May 1966. Manfred Mann's recording was a minor hit in the United States where it spent eight weeks on Billboards Hot 100 chart, peaking at number 29 during the week of August 6, 1966. It was also successful in Ireland, and was number one there for four weeks, keeping the Rolling Stones' "Paint It Black" at number two.

Song profile
The speaker describes a woman—whom "all of the guys call [...] 'Flamingo', 'cause her hair glows like the sun and her eyes can light the sky"—for whom the singer has fallen, and his plans to win her affection. Mark Barkan's daughter said that it was based on a girl who lived above a parking lot in his neighborhood: Barkan and his friends used to call out to her.

The recording features future Cream bassist Jack Bruce, who briefly joined the band in 1965.   The original demo of the song was recorded by noted New York City vocalist Jimmy Radcliffe stylized for The Drifters, but songwriter Mark Barkan was dissatisfied with the overly produced results and had Radcliffe recut the song with a pared-down arrangement.

After Barkan's death in 2020, Paul Jones of Manfred Mann said: "I'm a little bit ashamed to admit that not only did I never meet him, but I never even got in touch to say thank you for the song.  But I would like to thank him posthumously.  

Cash Box described the song as an "easy-going, teen-angled item about a rather fickle young gal."  In their review of Tommy Vann's earlier single release of the song, they described it as a "romantic ode all about a fella who aspires to one day snare a real special gal."

Charts

Cover Versions
Both the Everly Brothers and Gene Pitney released cover versions of "Pretty Flamingo" on albums they recorded in 1966 (the Everly Brothers' Two Yanks in England and Pitney's Backstage (I'm Lonely) [which was titled Nobody Needs Your Love in the U.K.]). Gerry and the Pacemakers also covered it on their U.S. “Girl On A Swing” LP, issued in December 1966.
Darius covered the song on the 2002 charity album NME in Association with War Child Presents 1 Love.
Elvis Costello covered the song solo on tour in 1989, and with Glenn Tilbrook, Chris Difford, and Nick Lowe at three festival dates that year.
Rod Stewart performs a cover of the song on his 1976 A Night on the Town.
Bruce Springsteen has covered the song several times live, especially during concerts on his 1975 tour. The version played during his second night at Hammersmith Odeon in 1975 stands out.
Yugoslav rock band Crni Biseri released a Serbo-Croatian version of the song, entitled "Lepi flamingo", in 1966.
Australian band Huxton Creepers from Melbourne released a cover of the song as a single in 1987.

References

External links
Official UK Chart website
Official Manfred Mann website

1966 singles
Manfred Mann songs
Irish Singles Chart number-one singles
UK Singles Chart number-one singles
Songs written by Mark Barkan
His Master's Voice singles

Song recordings produced by John Burgess